Glynllifon is the name of the old estate which belonged to the Barons Newborough, near the village of Llandwrog on the main A499 road between Pwllheli and Caernarfon in Gwynedd, Wales. The original mansion was until recently a privately owned hotel.

Parc Glynllifon

The greater part of the original park, Parc Glynllifon, now includes Coleg Meirion-Dwyfor's agricultural college, craft workshops and many educational facilities. There are also a cafe and maze at the entrance, and exhibits such as an 1854 De Winton horizontal stationary steam engine and Cornish boiler, which were restored by Fred Dibnah, can be seen. Many fairs are held in Glynllifon Park car park, especially steam and craft fairs.

The park is open to the public and includes gardens of historical and scientific importance; they have been designated Historical Garden (Grade I) status as well as a Site of Special Scientific Interest by Cadw and the Countryside Council for Wales.

Glynllifon is also a designated Special Area of Conservation under Annex II by the Joint Nature Conservation Committee. It is home to the Lesser horseshoe bat, Rhinolophus hipposideros. This 189.27 hectare site is both a maternity and hibernation site for about 6% of the UK population.

Plas Glynllifon

The present mansion house, Plas Glynllifon, was built in 1836–1848 to the designs of Edward Haycock, a Shrewsbury architect, and succeeded at least three previous houses on the site. The original building predated a rebuilding c.1600, which itself was rebuilt in 1751. That house, a 'moderate-sized brick mansion', was destroyed by a major fire in 1836. The rebuilding that followed and an extension in 1889-1890 largely form the house that exists today.

The house is a neoclassical 3-storey building with an attached lower service courtyard to the west and a symmetrical 13-bay south-facing facade dominated by a central hexastyle pedimented portico. It is built of stone with rendered elevations under a slate roof with rendered chimney stacks topped by moulded cornices and an Italianate water tank. It has got 102 rooms.

Glynllifon was the seat of the Glynn family until 1700, when it passed to the Wynn family of Bodvean. Sir Thomas John Wynn became the 1st Baron Newborough in 1776 and in 1888 Glynllifon passed down the family to Frederick George Wynn (1853-1932), the youngest son of Spencer Bukeley, 3rd Lord Newborough. In 1932 the estate reverted to Thomas John Wynn (1878-1957), 5th Baron Newborough, brother of William Charles Wynn (1873-1916), 4th Baron Newborough.

In 1948 the house was sold to a timber merchant and in 1954 the house and park were sold to Caernarfonshire County Council and used as offices and dormitories for the Glynllifon Agricultural College. In 1969 Plas Glynllifon played host to the Ball of the Investiture of the Prince of Wales held at Caernarfon Castle.

The house was from 2000 privately owned by several people, meant to be developed into a five-star country-house hotel and wedding venue, following a partial renovation from 2000 and a more substantial renovation from 2016. In January 2020 it was announced that the business was again in the hands of receivers. In June 2022 Plas Glynllifon was bought by a Manchester developer Davis Savage.

It is a Grade I listed building.

See also
List of gardens in Wales
Grade I listed buildings in Gwynedd

References

External links 

 

Gardens in Wales
History of Gwynedd
Special Areas of Conservation in Wales
Sites of Special Scientific Interest in West Gwynedd
Tourist attractions in Gwynedd
Preserved stationary steam engines
Country houses in Wales
Hotels in Gwynedd
Llandwrog
Grade I listed buildings in Gwynedd
Registered historic parks and gardens in Gwynedd